Charles M. Murphy Athletic Center (commonly known as the Murphy Center) is the name of the main athletic department building at Middle Tennessee State University in Murfreesboro, Tennessee. The building opened December 11, 1972, and is named in honor of former athletics director Charles M. "Bubber" Murphy, a standout athlete at the college in the 1930s, who also served as head coach of Middle Tennessee State's football (1947–1968), basketball (1948–1949), and baseball (1951, 1953–1955) programs.

Located on the northwest edge of MTSU's campus, adjacent to Johnny "Red" Floyd Stadium, Murphy Center houses most of the university's athletics offices, some classroom space, multiple practice gymnasiums, training rooms, locker rooms, weight rooms, dance studios, racquetball courts and, most notably, the 11,520-seat multi-purpose Monte Hale Arena. The building's campus abbreviation is MC.

Though the building appears to sit atop a hill, it is actually two levels high, with most of the first floor situated behind a berm. The first level contains Murphy Center's offices and facilities, which are positioned in a square under the arena's seating bowl. The arena floor itself is also on the first level, and is accessible from any of four portals. The main arena concourse makes up the second level, which is entirely above ground, and its exterior walls are composed completely of windows and metal frames. As a result, Murphy Center has earned the nickname "The Glass House". During the day, the interior of the arena is bathed with natural sunlight, so much so that a curtain was installed on the western side of the building to prevent glare during afternoon events. The bleacher sections on the concourse also help to shield the arena floor from the light.

Monte Hale Arena
Monte Hale Arena is home to the MTSU Blue Raiders men's and women's basketball teams, and features a bowl of permanent box seats around the basketball floor and 17 (originally 18) sections of retractable bleachers on the concourse above the bowl. The bleachers usually remain in their retracted state and are only opened for events in which the expected attendance is larger than the bowl of box seats will allow. The arena's seating structure is designed to be identical to the original configuration of the Joyce Center at the University of Notre Dame.

The arena itself is named in memory of Monte Hale, MTSU Athletics' radio play-by-play voice from 1961 to 1981, although it is most often simply called "Murphy Center", the name of the building that houses it.

Basketball
The first basketball game at Murphy Center featured the MTSU men's team hosting Vanderbilt on the arena's opening night. The Commodores defeated the Blue Raiders 69–57.

Murphy Center has hosted countless basketball games, and a few of those have been sold out. The largest crowd ever to witness a game on the hardwood of Monte Hale Arena was 11,807 on February 26, 2004, when the Blue Raiders defeated the WKU Hilltoppers 73–59. Other sold out sporting events include the women's basketball team's game on November 25, 2009, against the Tennessee Lady Vols. A crowd of 11,802 witnessed a close game but UT victory, 69–52.

The arena has also hosted the Ohio Valley Conference men's basketball tournament three times: 1975, 1985 and 1987; and hosted the Sun Belt Conference men's and women's basketball tournaments in 2006.

Monte Hale Arena also serves as home to the Tennessee Secondary School Athletic Association's (TSSAA) boys and girls Division I state high school basketball championships each March.

Volleyball
Select matches of the 2010 Sun Belt Conference Volleyball Tournament were held inside Murphy Center.

The final matches of the TSSAA volleyball championships are held inside Murphy Center each October.

The Lady Raiders volleyball team staged matches in Murphy Center until 2002, when the program moved to the neighboring Alumni Memorial Gymnasium.

Indoor Track and Field
When the bleachers are retracted, the upper concourse of the arena can also serve as an indoor track and field facility. The texture of the concourse's floor is designed to accommodate such events, and the lines for the running lanes are permanently painted onto the floor. Murphy Center has been home to 24 total Ohio Valley and Sun Belt Conference Indoor Championships.

Murphy Center is also famous for the creation of NCAA Indoor Last Chance Meets. In 1976, MTSU head coach track and field coach Dean Hayes got together with several other coaches looking for one final opportunity for their athletes to qualify for the NCAA Indoor Championships. The coaches held a meet at Murphy Center the week before the nationals, that would later go on to be known as NCAA Last Chance Meets. Today, there are at least six Last Chance Meets around the nation including; Ames, Iowa (Iowa State), South Bend, Ind. (Notre Dame), Blacksburg, Va. (Virginia Tech), Lincoln, Neb. (Nebraska), Fayetteville, Ark. (Arkansas), and Gainesville, Fla. (Florida).

Music venue
Especially during the 1970s and 1980s, but even through the late 1990s, Murphy Center was one of the Nashville area's premier concert venues, having the largest capacity of any suitable indoor facility in the region. Notably, Elvis Presley played a series of five sold-out shows in the arena in 1974 & 1975. On February 20, 1989, Bon Jovi played to a sold-out, standing room only crowd as part of their New Jersey Syndicate Tour at the center. U2 played the Center in 1987 to a sold-out crowd as part of their The Joshua Tree Tour.  However, the frequency and notability of concerts began to drop as trends changed. Large touring shows became more elaborate and demanded larger and more modern venues, such as Starwood Amphitheatre in Antioch (built in 1985, closed in 2006) and Bridgestone Arena in Nashville (built in 1996). Occasional concerts are still staged at Murphy Center, although they are typically geared toward the MTSU student body and feature lower-tier artists that draw smaller crowds. In 1991, Murphy Center gained notability as the site of The Judds' farewell concert as regular touring act (though they have since performed several shows together). Portions of Garth Brooks' 1992 NBC television special, This Is Garth Brooks, were also 
filmed at Murphy Center.

Convocations
Monte Hale Arena inside Murphy Center is used for occasional convocations of MTSU students, including CUSTOMS events for incoming freshmen and transfers. Homecoming week festivities and student-oriented concerts are also held inside the arena.

MTSU's graduation ceremonies take place at Murphy Center each May, August, and December. Several area high schools also regularly use Murphy Center to host graduation ceremonies.

History
The idea of a new arena for then-Middle Tennessee State College was conceptualized by school President Quill E. Cope in the early 1960s, as a response to MTSC's growth. Crowds for basketball games were getting too large for Memorial Gymnasium (now Alumni Memorial Gymnasium) to hold. Original plans had called for a 7,500-seat basketball-only facility and a separate building for the athletic department offices and field sports. When Cope retired in 1967, new University President Mel Scarlett combined the two concepts into one facility and envisioned a larger arena that could accommodate sports and other events, with a side benefit being the ability to move graduation ceremonies indoors. An architect was hired in 1968, construction began on Murphy Center in 1971, and the building opened on December 11, 1972.

In April 2012, the retractable bleachers in Section D were destroyed when the retraction motor malfunctioned and caused the structure to collapse. The arena was not in use at the time and no one was injured. , the section of bleachers has not been replaced. After the incident, the remaining 17 bleacher sections passed inspection and showed no further issues, but as a precautionary measure, their motors were replaced later that year. In a 2011 interview with The Daily News Journal, MTSU Athletics Director Chris Massaro envisioned a new indoor track facility elsewhere on campus that would allow the bleachers to be removed and replaced with suites.

The building underwent significant renovations in recent years to modernize the roof, lighting, air conditioning system, concession stands, and restrooms. In addition, adjustable curtains were installed over some of the eastern and southern windows of the arena to further prevent sunlight glare during afternoon events, especially for the benefit of those viewing the events on television. The $12.64 million project began in December 2013, and was completed prior to the 2014-15 basketball season. The upgrades were completed in phases in order to prevent total closure and keep the building functional for most events through the renovation period, although area high school graduations were moved elsewhere. As a result of the 2014 renovations, the white foam waffle-shaped ceiling panels, a highly-visible and distinctive characteristic of Monte Hale Arena, were permanently removed. The tiles had been an aesthetic design element upon the arena's construction, and also acted as an acoustic buffer. Following the renovations, Murphy Center's ceiling was painted black, and acoustic curtains were installed to help absorb noise.

Other improvements implemented since 2002 include a new wooden floor, all-new blue seats in the reserved seating sections, two new scoreboards (one above the bleachers at each end of the court) with HD videoboards included, four new LED video scoreboards (one above each of the four tunnels at the corners of the court), a new sound system, and modernizing the existing bleacher sections (painting gray, replacing retraction motors, and bringing to ADA standards). The court's design was rotated 180 degrees, along with correspondingly moving the benches, scorers' table, and media row to the opposite sides in order to better accommodate television broadcasts. The locker rooms for the men's tennis and men's & women's basketball teams have been completely renovated as well.

Gallery

See also
 List of NCAA Division I basketball arenas

References

External links

Murphy Center Complex website

Middle Tennessee Blue Raiders basketball
College basketball venues in the United States
Basketball venues in Tennessee
Buildings and structures completed in 1972
Buildings and structures in Murfreesboro, Tennessee
Indoor arenas in Tennessee